The George Matthias Bernhardt House is a historic plantation house located near Rockwell, Rowan County, North Carolina.

Description and history 
It was built in about 1855, and is a two-story, "T"-plan, Greek Revival-style frame dwelling. It has a gable roof, sits on a brick foundation, and is sheathed in weatherboard. Also on the 323 acre property are the contributing double pen log barn, log smokehouse, well shed, two granaries, and plantation office. Paul Mathias Bernhardt (1846-1922), a son of George Matthias Bernhardt (1820-1885), built the Bernhardt House at Salisbury, North Carolina.

It was listed on the National Register of Historic Places on November 26, 1982.

References

Plantation houses in North Carolina
Houses on the National Register of Historic Places in North Carolina
Greek Revival houses in North Carolina
Houses completed in 1855
Houses in Rowan County, North Carolina
National Register of Historic Places in Rowan County, North Carolina
1855 establishments in North Carolina